The pulmonary valve (sometimes referred to as the pulmonic valve) is a valve of the heart that lies between the right ventricle and the pulmonary artery and has three cusps. It is one of the four valves of the heart and one of the two semilunar valves, the other being the aortic valve. Similar to the aortic valve, the pulmonary valve opens in ventricular systole, when the pressure in the right ventricle rises above the pressure in the pulmonary artery.  At the end of ventricular systole, when the pressure in the right ventricle falls rapidly, the pressure in the pulmonary artery will close the pulmonary valve.

The closure of the pulmonary valve contributes the P2 component of the second heart sound (S2). The right heart is a low-pressure system, so the P2 component of the second heart sound is usually softer than the A2 component of the second heart sound. However, it is physiologically normal in some young people to hear both components separated during inhalation.

Description
 At the apex of the infundibulum, the pulmonary orifice is guarded by three semilunar cusps - two in front and one behind, with free edges projecting upward into the lumen of pulmonary trunk. The free edge of each cusp presents a fibrous nodule of semilunar cusp at the centre with two lateral thin portions, the lunule of semilunar cusp. Each cusp forms pocket like dilatation called pulmonary sinus at initial portion of pulmonary trunk

See also
 Heart valve
 Pulmonary atresia

Additional images

References

External links

 
 Adult Congenital Surgery: Pulmonary Valve Replacement

Cardiac anatomy
Heart valves